It Doesn't Have to Make Sense is the sixth studio album by American singer-songwriter Ingrid Michaelson, released on August 26, 2016, through Cabin 24 Records under exclusive license to Mom + Pop Music. The album's lead single, "Hell No", was released on April 29, 2016.

Promotion
To promote the album, Michaelson embarked on the "Hell No Tour" on October 6, 2016, in Cincinnati, Ohio. Promotional appearances in the media to support the album included a performance of "Hell No" on The Tonight Show Starring Jimmy Fallon on June 7, 2016, and a performance of "Hell No" on The Late Late Show with James Corden on August 22, 2016. Michaelson then performed "Still the One" on Live with Kelly on September 28, 2016.

On August 15, a playlist featuring 30 seconds of every song was uploaded to Spotify.

Singles
The lead single, "Hell No", was released on April 29, 2016.

Promotional singles
On June 24, 2016, "Light Me Up" was released as the first promotional single to digital outlets.

On August 19, 2016, "Celebrate" was released as the second promotional single to digital outlets.

Alter Egos
An EP of five re-worked tracks featuring new artists, titled Alter Egos, was released on 12 May 2017. "Celebrate" featuring AJR was released as a promotional single ahead of the EP's release. Other featured artists include Sara Bareilles and Tegan & Sara.

Track listing

Alter Egos track listing

Personnel
Credits adapted from AllMusic.

Musicians

 Ingrid Michaelson – piano, vocals
 Butterfly Boucher – bass guitar
 Tyler Burkum – electric guitar
 Cason Cooley – electric guitar, keyboards, piano
 Jonathan Dinklage – viola, violin
 Dave Eggar – cello
 Katie Herzig – keyboards, background vocals
 Chris Kuffner – bass guitar, guitar, synthesizer
 Billy Libby – guitar
 Tony Lucido – bass guitar
 Jeremy Lutito – drums
 Saul Simon MacWilliams – drums, synthesizer
 Dan Romer – drums
 Adele Stein – cello
 Ben Thornewill – piano

Technical personnel

 Ingrid Michaelson – producer
 Chris Athens – mastering
 David Boman – engineer
 Michaela Bosch – paintings
 Cason Cooley – producer, programming
 Barry Dean – vocal producer
 Serban Ghenea – mixing
 Ryan Gore – vocal engineer
 Lynn Grossman – A&R
 John Hanes – engineer
 Katie Herzig – producer, programming
 Mary Hooper – package design
 Chris Kuffner – engineer, producer, programming
 Shervin Lainez – photography
 Luke Laird – producer, programming
 Nick Lobel – mixing assistant
 Saul Simon MacWilliams – engineer
 Buckley Miller – bass engineer, drum engineering
 Sean Moffitt – mixing
 Ken Rich – engineer, piano engineer
 Bess Rogers – engineer
 Dan Romer – engineer, producer
 F. Reid Shippen – mixing

Charts

Weekly charts

Release history

References

External links

2016 albums
Ingrid Michaelson albums
Mom + Pop Music albums